2nd TFCA Awards 
December 16, 1998

Best Film: 
 Saving Private Ryan 
The 2nd Toronto Film Critics Association Awards, honoring the best in film for 1998, were held on 16 December 1998.

Winners
Best Actor: 
Ian McKellen - Gods and Monsters
Runners-Up: Robert Duvall – The Apostle and Tom Hanks – Saving Private Ryan

Best Actress: 
Cate Blanchett - Elizabeth
Runners-Up: Christina Ricci – The Opposite of Sex and Pascale Bussières – August 32nd on Earth

Best Canadian Film: 
Last Night
Runners-Up: Nô and The Red Violin

Best Director: 
Steven Spielberg - Saving Private Ryan
Runners-Up: Todd Solondz – Happiness and Steven Soderbergh – Out of Sight

Best Film:
Saving Private Ryan
Runners-Up: Happiness and The Celebration

Clyde Gilmour Award: 
Gerald Pratley

References

1998
1998 film awards
1998 in Toronto
1998 in Canadian cinema